"You'll Never Know" is the third single by Australian rock-pop band 1927. The track was released in January 1989 and peaked at number 15 in March on the ARIA singles chart. The song is taken from their debut album...ish which peaked at number 1 on the ARIA Charts in April 1989.

Track listing
 7" single

 12" single / CD single

Charts

Weekly chart

Year-end chart

References

1927 (band) songs
1988 songs
1989 singles
Warner Music Group singles